The 2013 season for the  team began in January at the Tour Down Under. As a UCI ProTeam, they were automatically invited and obligated to send a squad to every event in the UCI World Tour.

Having lost the sponsorship of Rabobank after seventeen years in the sport, the team were able to compete during the 2013 season due to Rabobank funding. As a result, the team ran as the Blanco Pro Cycling team for the first half of the season. Prior to the Tour de France, it was announced that Belkin, an American manufacturer of consumer electronics, acquired title sponsorship of the team in a -year deal.

2013 roster

Riders who joined the team for the 2013 season

Riders who left the team during or after the 2012 season

Season victories

Footnotes

References

2013 road cycling season by team
2013
2013 in Dutch sport